Richard Scott (born August 1, 1978) is a Canadian former ice hockey player who played 10 games for the New York Rangers of the  National Hockey League (NHL) during the 2001–02 and 2003–04 seasons.  After suffering a concussion in a fight against Eric Cairns on December 4, 2003, Scott was forced to retire from hockey.

Career statistics

External links

1978 births
Living people
Canadian ice hockey left wingers
Charlotte Checkers (1993–2010) players
Hartford Wolf Pack players
Ice hockey people from Ontario
Oshawa Generals players
New York Rangers players
People from Orillia
Undrafted National Hockey League players